U-100 may refer to one of the following German submarines:

 , a Type U 57 submarine launched in 1917 and that served in the First World War until surrendered on 27 November 1918; broken up at Swansea in 1922
 During the First World War, Germany also had these submarines with similar names:
 , a Type UB III submarine launched in 1918 and surrendered on 22 November 1918; broken up at Dordrecht in 1922
 , a Type UC III submarine launched in 1918 and surrendered on 22 November 1918; broken up at Cherbourg in July 1921
 , a Type VIIB submarine that served in the Second World War until sunk on 17 March 1941

Submarines of Germany